Brandon Mitchell is an American businessman and politician, serving as a member of the Idaho House of Representatives from the 6th district. Elected in November 2020 (5th district), he assumed office on December 1, 2020. Following re-districting in 2022, Mitchell was re-elected in the 6th district which includes Latah, Lewis, and part of Nez Perce Counties.

Early life and education 
Mitchell was raised in Syracuse, Utah, and graduated from Clearfield High School. After attending Weber State University, Mitchell earned a Bachelor of Business Administration from Brigham Young University–Idaho.

Career 
From 1989 to 1999, Mitchell managed a Jiffy Lube location in Portland, Oregon. He later became a district manager for the company. Since 2015, he has also worked as a scuba instructor. Mitchell and his wife co-own Candura Corporation, a holding company that operates two Jiffy Lube franchises in Idaho.

Political career 
Mitchell was an unsuccessful candidate for a seat on the Moscow, Idaho City Council in 2019. He was elected to the Idaho House of Representatives in November 2020 and assumed office on December 1, 2020, succeeding Bill Goesling.

References 

Living people
Businesspeople from Idaho
Republican Party members of the Idaho House of Representatives
People from Syracuse, Utah
Brigham Young University–Idaho alumni
21st-century American politicians
People from Clearfield, Utah
Year of birth missing (living people)